Benoît Joachim (born 14 January 1976) is a retired professional road racing cyclist from Luxembourg.

Biography
Joachim started his professional career at the age of 18 for a small Italian cycling team, Sonego Sport. After racing with them for three months, he was noticed by the bigger, De Nardi who were interesting him. After riding with De Nardi for 3 years, he joined the Us Postall Pro Cycling Team and rode as a super-domestique for the team. He has competed in eleven Grand Tours, including the Tour de France (2000, 2002), the Giro d'Italia (2005, 2006, 2007), and the Vuelta a España (1999, 2001, 2003, 2004, 2005, 2006).  His career highlight is becoming crowned many Luxembourg National Road Race Champion titles and Luxembourg National Time Trial Champion. In addition, Joachim became the first Luxembourger to wear the race leader's golden jersey at the 2004 Vuelta a España. Joachim wore the jersey for two days. In 2007, Joachim transferred to the Astana outfit, but left them after two seasons, and rode for Differdange during 2009. At the end of the season, he ended his professional career.

His younger brother Aurélien is a Luxembourg international footballer.

Major results

1998
 1st stage Tour de L'avenir
 1999
 PruTour
 1st Stage 1
 2nd overall

2000 
 1st –  National Road Race Championship
 2nd overall – Tour de Luxembourg
2004
 1st –  National Time Trial Championship
 9th overall – Tour de Wallonie
 1st stage 1 (TTT) Tour of Spain
 General classification leader (Stages 3 and 4) – Vuelta a España
 24th Time trial Olympic Games in Athens
2005
 7th, Prologue – Tour of Benelux
2006
 1st –  National Time Trial Championship
2007
 1st –  National Road Race Championship

Grand Tour results

Tour de France 
2 participations
 2000 : 92nd
 2002 : 89th

Giro d'Italia 
3 participations
 2005 : 107th
 2006 : 83rd
 2007 : 99th

Vuelta a España 
6 participations
 1999 : abandon
 2001 : 42nd
 2003 : 59th
 2004 : 57th,  golden jersey during 2 days
 2005 : non-runner at the 13th stage
 2006 : 66th

References

External links
 Benoît Joachim cycling career at FirstCycling.com

Cyclists at the 2004 Summer Olympics
Luxembourgian male cyclists
Olympic cyclists of Luxembourg
Sportspeople from Luxembourg City
1976 births
Living people